Expressions is an album by Chick Corea, released in 1994 through the record label GRP. The album peaked at number ten on Billboard Top Jazz Albums chart.

The Album is dedicated to Art Tatum.

Track listing 

 "Lush Life" (Billy Strayhorn) – 6:29
 "This Nearly Was Mine" (Oscar Hammerstein II, Richard Rodgers) – 3:32
 "It Could Happen To You" (Johnny Burke, James Van Heusen) – 3:35
 "My Ship" (Ira Gershwin, Kurt Weill) – 3:18
 "I Didn't Know What Time It Was" (Lorenz Hart, Richard Rodgers) – 4:05
 "Monk's Mood" (Thelonious Monk) – 5:33
 "Oblivion" (Bud Powell) – 3:46
 "Pannonica" (Thelonious Monk) – 6:05
 "Someone to Watch Over Me" (George Gershwin, Ira Gershwin) – 5:59
 "Armando's Rhumba" (Chick Corea) – 4:18
 "Blues for Art" (Chick Corea) – 4:48
 "Stella By Starlight" (Ned Washington, Victor Young) – 4:34
 "I Want to Be Happy" (Irving Caesar, Vincent Youmans) – 4:50
 "Smile" (Charlie Chaplin, Geoff Parsons, John Turner) – 2:32

UK version added "Anna" written by A. J. Corea on the original album.

Personnel 
Musician
 Chick Corea – piano

Production
 Tom Banghart – mixing
 Bernie Kirsh – engineering, mixing

Chart performance

References

External links
 http://chickcorea.com/albums/expressions/

1994 albums
Chick Corea albums
GRP Records albums